Now Khaleh or Nowkhaleh or Nau Khaleh may refer to:
 Now Khaleh-ye Akbari
 Now Khaleh-ye Jafari